Particle identification is the process of using information left by a particle passing through a particle detector to identify the type of particle.  Particle identification reduces backgrounds and improves measurement resolutions, and is essential to many analyses at particle detectors.

Charged particles
Charged particles have been identified using a variety of techniques.  All methods rely on a measurement of the momentum in a tracking chamber combined with a measurement of the velocity to determine the charged particle mass, and therefore its identity.

Specific ionization
A charged particle loses energy in matter by ionization at a rate determined in part by its velocity.  The energy loss per unit distance is typically called dE/dx.  The energy loss is measured either in dedicated detectors, or in tracking chambers designed to also measure energy loss.  The energy lost in a thin layer of material is subject to large fluctuations, and therefore accurate dE/dx determination requires a large number of measurements.  Individual measurements in the low and high energy tails are excluded.

Time of flight
Time of flight detectors determine charged particle velocity by measuring the time required to travel from the interaction point to the time of flight detector, or between two detectors.  The ability to distinguish particle types diminishes as the particle velocity approaches its maximum allowed value, speed of light, and thus is efficient only for particles with a small Lorentz factor.

Cherenkov detectors
Cherenkov radiation is emitted by a charged particle when it passes through a material with a speed greater than c/n, where n is the index of refraction of the material.  The angle of the photons with respect to the charged particle direction depends on velocity.  A number of Cherenkov detector geometries have been used.

Photons
Photons are identified because they leave all their energy in a detector's electromagnetic calorimeter, but do not appear in the tracking chamber (see, for example, ATLAS Inner Detector) because they are neutral.  A neutral pion which decays inside the EM calorimeter can replicate this effect.

Electrons
Electrons appear as a track in the inner detector and deposit all their energy in the electromagnetic calorimeter.  The energy deposited in the calorimeter must match the momentum measured in the tracking chamber.

Muons
Muons penetrate more material than other charged particles, and can therefore be identified by their presence in the outermost detectors.

Tau particles
Tau identification requires differentiating the narrow "jet" produced by the hadronic decay of the tau from ordinary quark jets.

Neutrinos
Neutrinos do not interact in particle detectors, and therefore escape undetected.  Their presence can be inferred by the momentum imbalance of the visible particles in an event.  In electron-positron colliders, both the neutrino momentum in all three dimensions and the neutrino energy can be reconstructed.  Neutrino energy reconstruction requires accurate charged particle identification.  In colliders using hadrons, only the momentum transverse to the beam direction can be determined.

Neutral hadrons
Neutral hadrons can sometimes be identified in calorimeters.  In particular, antineutrons and KL0s can be identified.  Neutral hadrons can also be identified at electron-positron colliders in the same way as neutrinos.

Heavy quarks
Quark flavor tagging identifies the flavor of quark a jet comes from. B-tagging, the identification of bottom quarks, is the most important example.
B-tagging relies on the b quark being the heaviest quark involved in a hadronic decay (tops are heavier but to have a top in a decay is necessary to produce some heavier particle to have a subsequent decay into a top). This implies that the b quark has a short lifetime and is possible to look for its decay vertex in the inner tracker. Additionally, its decay products are transversal to the beam, resulting in a high jet multiplicity. Charm tagging using similar techniques is also possible, but extremely difficult due to the lower mass.
Tagging jets from lighter quarks is simply impossible, due to QCD background there are simply too many indistinguishable jets.

See also
Spark chamber
Wire chamber

References

Experimental particle physics